Katleho Ramaphakela, is a South African filmmaker, film producer and actor. He is best known as the director and producer of popular television serials and films Check Coast, Thulani No Thuli and Seriously Single.

Personal life
He has one brother: Tshepo and one sister: Rethabile.

Career
Along with his brother and sister, Rethabile co-founded the film production company 'Burnt Onion' in 2010. In 2012, he played the role 'Thami' in the SABC1 drama series Intersexions and in which he later nominated for a SAFTA Award in the category Best Actor in a Drama Series. He produced the SABC1 sitcoms My Perfect Family, Thuli noThulani, and Vuzu mockumentary Check-Coast through the production house.

Other than production, he then appeared in popular television sitcoms and serials such as Scandal!, Wild at Heart, Isidingo, Backstage and Kota Life Crisis. Apart from television, he starred in few number of films including: Blood and Oil, Mary and Martha, Iron Will, Finding Lenny and Journey is the Destination. He is also a prolific writer, who wrote the several 'Lokshin Bioskop' productions Uyaphapha, Reflections, Check-Coast, 4 Hours, Kasi Superhero and Naledi. In 2017, he played the popular role 'Detective Dlamini' in the television serial Bedford Wives.

In August 2020, he directed the comedy film Seriously Single with his sister Rethabile. It was released on July 31, 2020 on Netflix.

Filmography

References

External links
 

Living people
South African male film actors
South African male television actors
Year of birth missing (living people)
South African film directors